BV Groningen, also known as BVG, is a Dutch basketball club based in Groningen. In the 1979–80 season, the team played in the Eredivisie, the highest tier of Dutch basketball. 

The club was established on 17 December 1969 by Bil Pijl and Dick Jager. In 1979, the team promoted to the Eredivisie. In its first season, the team had a 2–38 record. The team disappeared in 1994 before it was re-founded in 2004.

References

External links
Official website

Basketball teams established in 1969
Basketball teams in the Netherlands
Former Dutch Basketball League teams
BV Groningen